The following radio stations are located in and transmitted from Oranjestad, Aruba. These are 16 radio stations in Oranjestad, Aruba

FM Stations

See also
Lists of radio stations in Africa
Lists of radio stations in Asia
Lists of radio stations in Europe
Lists of radio stations in South America
Lists of radio stations in the South Pacific and Oceania

Aruba
Aruba